SqueezeNet is the name of a deep neural network for computer vision that was released in 2016. SqueezeNet was developed by researchers at DeepScale, University of California, Berkeley, and Stanford University. In designing SqueezeNet, the authors' goal was to create a smaller neural network with fewer parameters that can more easily fit into computer memory and can more easily be transmitted over a computer network.

Framework support for SqueezeNet 
SqueezeNet was originally released on February 22, 2016. This original version of SqueezeNet was implemented on top of the Caffe deep learning software framework. Shortly thereafter, the open-source research community ported SqueezeNet to a number of other deep learning frameworks. On February 26, 2016, Eddie Bell released a port of SqueezeNet for the Chainer deep learning framework. On March 2, 2016, Guo Haria released a port of SqueezeNet for the Apache MXNet framework. On June 3, 2016, Tammy Yang released a port of SqueezeNet for the Keras framework. In 2017, companies including Baidu, Xilinx, Imagination Technologies, and Synopsys demonstrated SqueezeNet running on low-power processing platforms such as smartphones, FPGAs, and custom processors.

As of 2018, SqueezeNet ships "natively" as part of the source code of a number of deep learning frameworks such as PyTorch, Apache MXNet, and Apple CoreML. In addition, 3rd party developers have created implementations of SqueezeNet that are compatible with frameworks such as TensorFlow. Below is a summary of frameworks that support SqueezeNet.

Relationship to AlexNet 
SqueezeNet was originally described in a paper entitled "SqueezeNet: AlexNet-level accuracy with 50x fewer parameters and <0.5MB model size." AlexNet is a deep neural network that has 240MB of parameters, and SqueezeNet has just 5MB of parameters. However, it's important to note that SqueezeNet is not a "squeezed version of AlexNet." Rather, SqueezeNet is an entirely different DNN architecture than AlexNet. What SqueezeNet and AlexNet have in common is that both of them achieve approximately the same level of accuracy when evaluated on the ImageNet image classification validation dataset.

Relationship to Deep Compression 
Model compression (e.g. quantization and pruning of model parameters) can be applied to a deep neural network after it has been trained. In the SqueezeNet paper, the authors demonstrated that a model compression technique called Deep Compression can be applied to SqueezeNet to further reduce the size of the parameter file from 5MB to 500KB. Deep Compression has also been applied to other DNNs such as AlexNet and VGG.

Offshoots of SqueezeNet 
Some of the members of the original SqueezeNet team have continued to develop resource-efficient deep neural networks for a variety of applications. A few of these works are noted in the following table. As with the original SqueezeNet model, the open-source research community has ported and adapted these newer "squeeze"-family models for compatibility with multiple deep learning frameworks.

In addition, the open-source research community has extended SqueezeNet to other applications, including semantic segmentation of images and style transfer.

References 

Deep learning software applications
Artificial neural networks
Object recognition and categorization
Software using the BSD license